Ihar Logvinaw (born 23 August 1983) is a Belarusian professional football coach and a former player. He works as an assistant manager with  FC Mashuk-KMV Pyatigorsk.

Career

Club
Logvinaw left Shirak in December 2011 after a new Football Federation of Armenia regulation stated clubs could not field foreign goalkeepers.

Honours
Shakhtyor Soligorsk
Belarusian Premier League champion: 2005

Shirak
Armenian Cup winner: 2011–12

Minsk
Belarusian Cup winner: 2012–13

References

External links
 

1983 births
Living people
Belarusian footballers
Belarus under-21 international footballers
Association football goalkeepers
Belarusian expatriate footballers
Expatriate footballers in Ukraine
Expatriate footballers in Armenia
Armenian Premier League players
Belarusian Premier League players
FC Torpedo Minsk players
FC Darida Minsk Raion players
FC Energetik-BGU Minsk players
FC Shakhtyor Soligorsk players
FC Mariupol players
FC Gomel players
FC Granit Mikashevichi players
FC Belshina Bobruisk players
FC Shirak players
FC Minsk players
FC Isloch Minsk Raion players
FC Viktoryja Marjina Horka players
Belarusian football managers
Belarusian expatriate football managers
Expatriate football managers in Russia
Footballers from Minsk